Melanie Lynne Newman (born May 27, 1991) is an American radio and television play-by-play broadcaster for the Baltimore Orioles of Major League Baseball (MLB) and national Friday Night Baseball broadcasts on Apple TV+. She is the first woman to be a play-by-play announcer for the Orioles and one of only four female play-by-play broadcasters active in MLB.

Career 
Newman began her broadcasting career while as a student at Troy University, where she majored in broadcast journalism. She was the play-by-play announcer for Troy's volleyball team, as well as calling baseball and softball games as a student. She graduated in 2013. 

She called games in Minor League Baseball for several years, including at High-A and Double-A. Newman worked as a sideline reporter for Fox Sports Southwest and served as play-by-play announcer for the Frisco RoughRiders. In 2019, she joined Suzie Cool as part of the first all-female broadcast team in professional baseball when she served as play-by-play broadcaster for the Salem Red Sox.

In 2020, the Orioles announced that Newman had joined their broadcast team. The COVID-19 pandemic delayed the start of the MLB season, and so she made her debut on August 4, 2020, becoming the first woman to ever call a regular-season Orioles game when she was part of the radio broadcast team. Newman also served as a sideline reporter and a studio host for Orioles' television broadcasts. On July 20, 2021, Newman was the play-by-play announcer as part of the first all-female broadcast team, who called the Baltimore Orioles vs. Tampa Bay Rays game for YouTube.

On September 29, 2021, Newman teamed with Jessica Mendoza to call a game between the Los Angeles Dodgers and San Diego Padres for ESPN. It marked the first time that an all-female broadcast team called a nationally televised Major League Baseball game.

In the 2022 MLB season, Newman became the lead play-by-play announcer for Apple TV+ Friday Night Baseball.

Personal life 
Newman grew up in Woodstock, Georgia.

References 

1991 births
Living people
American radio sports announcers
American television sports announcers
Baltimore Orioles announcers
Major League Baseball broadcasters
Minor League Baseball broadcasters
People from Atlanta
Troy University alumni
Women sports announcers